Khndzorut may refer to:
Khndzorut, Lori, Armenia
Khndzorut, Vayots Dzor, Armenia